Belarus competed at the 2018 European Athletics Championships in Berlin, Germany, from 6–12 August 2018. A delegation of 38 athletes were sent to represent the country.

The following athletes were selected to compete by the Belarus Athletics Federation.

Medals

Results
 Men
 Track and road

Field events

Combined events – Decathlon

Women
 Track and road

Field events

References

Nations at the 2018 European Athletics Championships
Belarus at the European Athletics Championships
European Athletics Championships